The Voice Kids is a Ukrainian television music competition to find new singing talent. The first series began airing on 4 November 2012, being broadcast on a weekly basis on 1+1. It is hosted by Andrii Domanskyi, Kateryna Osadcha and the coaches are Tina Karol, Oleg Skrypka and Svetlana Loboda.

Coaches and finalists
 – Winning coach/contestant. Winners are in bold,eliminated contestants in small font.
 – Runner-up coach/contestant. Final contestant first listed.

Blind auditions
During the Blind auditions, each coach must now form a team of 15 young artists.

It airs from November 4.

Color key

Episode 1 (November 4)

Episode 2 (November 11)

Episode 3 (November 18)

Episode 4 (November 25)

Episode 5 (December 2)

Episode 6 (December 9)

The Battles
In the second stage, called the battle phase, coaches have three of their team members battle against each other directly by singing the same song together, with the coach choosing which team member to advance from each of individual "battles" into the Semifinal stage.

Color key

Semifinal

Episode 9 (December 30)

Final

Episode 10 (January 6)

Round 1 
In this phase of the competition, each of the top nine finalists took the stage and performed a solo song. The television audience choose the final three artists who advanced to the next round.

Round 2 
The final round of the competition featured the top three finalists doing duets with their coach. Before the start of the performances, voting lines were opened live-in-show for the television audience to vote for the final three and decide the winner. The winner of The Voice Kids was announced at the end of the show.

The Voice of Ukraine
2012 Ukrainian television seasons
2013 Ukrainian television seasons